Colombiazomus is a monotypic genus of hubbardiid short-tailed whipscorpions, first described by Armas & Delgado-Santa in 2012. Its single species, Colombiazomus truncatus is distributed in Colombia.

References 

Schizomida genera
Monotypic arachnid genera